Chain snake may refer to:

 Daboia russelii, a.k.a. the Russell's viper, a venomous viper species found in Asia
 Daboia siamensis, the Eastern Russell's viper, a venomous viper species found in Asia
 Lampropeltis g. getula, a.k.a. the eastern kingsnake, a harmless colubrid species found in the eastern United States

Animal common name disambiguation pages